Janjira may refer to:

 Janjira State, a pre-1948 princely state of the erstwhile British Raj and located in the modern day Raigad district, Maharashtra
 Murud-Janjira, a historic fort on an island off the coast of Murud village, Raigad district, Maharashtra
 Janjira, a fictional Japanese nuclear powered experiment city depicted in the 2014 film Godzilla, located along the coast line somewhere near Mount Fuji.